Cyana divakara is a species of moth of the family Erebidae first described by Frederic Moore in 1866. It is found in India (including Sikkim).

References

Moths described in 1866
Cyana